George Burrill Earl (7 August 1859 — 20 April 1933, born George Burrill Earle) was an English cricketer who played for Derbyshire in 1883 and 1888.

Earl was born  in Melbourne, Derbyshire and worked as a "boot clicker" - that is working a machine to make lace holes in boot uppers.

Earl played in one first-class match during the 1883 season, though in the one innings he played, he was caught out quickly and put lower down the order. He played two further matches for the club in the 1888 season, when the club's matches were not accorded first-class status. He was a right-handed batsman and a right-arm medium-fast bowler.

Earl died at Melbourne at the age of 77.

References

1859 births
1933 deaths
English cricketers
Derbyshire cricketers
People from Melbourne, Derbyshire
Cricketers from Derbyshire